Margaret Lucas Cavendish, Duchess of Newcastle-upon-Tyne (1623 – 15 December 1673) was an English philosopher, poet, scientist, fiction writer and playwright. 

Her husband, William Cavendish, 1st Duke of Newcastle-upon-Tyne, was Royalist commander in Northern England during the First English Civil War and in 1644 went into self-imposed exile in France. Margaret accompanied him and remained abroad until the Stuart Restoration in 1660. She wrote in her own name in a period when most women writers remained anonymous.

Background
Born Margaret Lucas to Sir Thomas Lucas (1573–1625) and Elizabeth Leighton (died 1647), she was the youngest child of the family. She had four sisters and three brothers, the royalists Sir John Lucas, Sir Thomas Lucas and Sir Charles Lucas, who owned the manor of St John's Abbey, Colchester. She became an attendant on Queen Henrietta Maria and travelled with her into exile in France, living for a time at the court of the young King Louis XIV. She became the second wife of William Cavendish, 1st Duke of Newcastle-upon-Tyne in 1645, when he was a marquess.

Writings
Cavendish, as a poet, philosopher, writer of prose romances, essayist and playwright, published under her own name at a time when most women writers remained anonymous. Her topics included gender, power, manners, scientific method and philosophy. Her utopian romance The Blazing World is one of the earliest examples of science fiction. She was unusual in her time for publishing extensively in natural philosophy and early modern science, producing over a dozen original works; with her revised works the total came to 21.

Cavendish has been championed and criticised as a unique, ground-breaking woman writer. She rejected the Aristotelianism and mechanical philosophy of the 17th century, preferring a vitalist model. In May 1667, she became the first woman to attend a meeting at the Royal Society of London, criticising and engaging with members and philosophers Thomas Hobbes, René Descartes, and Robert Boyle. She has been claimed as an early opponent of animal testing.

Cavendish's publications brought her fame and helped to disprove the contemporary belief that women were inherently inferior to men. Cavendish used them to advocate women's education: women were capable of learning and benefiting from education, and she insisted her own works would have been better still if, like her brothers, she had been able to attend school.

Early years

Childhood

Cavendish's father, Thomas Lucas, was exiled after a duel that led to the death of "one Mr. Brooks", but pardoned by King James. He returned to England in 1603. As the youngest of eight, Cavendish recorded spending a lot of time with her siblings. She had no formal education, but had access to libraries and tutors, although she hinted that the children paid little heed to tutors, who were "rather for formality than benefit". Cavendish began putting ideas down on paper at an early age, although it was poorly accepted for women to display such intelligence at the time and she kept her efforts in the privacy of her home. The family had significant means and Cavendish stated that her widowed mother chose to keep her family in a condition "not much lower" than when her father was alive; the children had access to "honest pleasures and harmless delights". Her mother had little to no male help.

Lady-in-waiting
When Queen Henrietta Maria was in Oxford, Cavendish never gained permission from her mother to become a lady-in-waiting. She accompanied the Queen into exile in France, away from her family for the first time. She notes that while she was confident in the company of her siblings, amongst strangers she became bashful, being afraid she might speak or act inappropriately without her siblings' guidance, while anxious to be well received and well liked. She spoke only when necessary and so came to be regarded as a fool, which Cavendish stated that she preferred to being seen as wanton or rude.

Regretting that she had left home to be a lady-in-waiting, Cavendish informed her mother that she wanted to leave the court, but her mother persuaded her not to disgrace herself by leaving and provided her with funds that Cavendish noted quite exceeded the normal means of a courtier. She remained a lady-in-waiting for two more years before marrying William Cavendish, then still Marquess of Newcastle.

Marriage to the Marquess
Cavendish noted that her husband liked her bashfulness; he was the only man she was ever in love with, not for his title, wealth or power, but for merit, justice, gratitude, duty and fidelity. She saw these as attributes that held people together even in misfortune, and in their case helped them to endure suffering for their political allegiance. Cavendish had no children, despite efforts by her physician to help her conceive. Her husband had five surviving children from a previous marriage, two of whom, Jane and Elizabeth, wrote a comic play, The Concealed Fancies.

Cavendish later wrote a biography of her husband: The Life of the Thrice Noble, High and Puissant Prince William Cavendish. In her dedication, Cavendish recalls a time when rumours surrounded the authorship of her works: that her husband wrote them. Cavendish notes that her husband defended her from these, but admits to a creative relationship, even as her writing tutor, for writing "fashions an image of a husband and wife who rely on each other in the public realm of print."

Personal life

Financial problems
A few years after her marriage, she and her husband's brother, Sir Charles Cavendish, returned to England. Cavendish had heard that her husband's estate, sequestrated due to his being a royalist delinquent, would be sold and that she as his wife could hope to benefit from the sale. In the event she received no benefit. She noted that while many women petitioned for funds, she herself only did so once, and being denied decided such efforts were not worth the trouble. After a year and a half she left England to be with her husband again.

Character and health
Cavendish stated in A True Relation of My Birth, Breeding, and Life that her bashful nature, which she described as "melancholia", made her "repent my going from home to see the World abroad." It manifested itself in reluctance to discuss her work in public, but this she satirised in her writing. Cavendish defined and sought self-cures for the physical manifestations of her melancholia, which included "chill paleness", inability to speak, and erratic gestures.

Religious beliefs
Cavendish's views on God and religion remained ambiguous. Her writings show her as a Christian, but she did not often address the matter. In her Physical Opinions, she explicitly stated her belief in the existence of God – "Pray account me not an Atheist, but believe as I do in God Almighty," – but sought to split philosophy from theology and so avoid debating God's actions in many of her philosophical works.

Her theological temerity was unusual at a time when much women's writing was built around religion. Although Cavendish acknowledged God's existence, she held "that natural reason cannot perceive or have an idea of an immaterial being." So "when we name God, we name an Inexpressible, and Incomprehensible Being."

Fashion and fame

Cavendish in her memoir explained her enjoyment in reinventing herself through fashion. She said she aimed at uniqueness in dress, thoughts and behaviour, and disliked wearing the same fashions as other women. She also made her desire for fame public. Several passages remark on her virtuous character: while acknowledging goodness in others, she thought it acceptable to hope to better them and even achieve everlasting fame.

She expected to be criticised for deciding to write a memoir, but retorted that it was written for herself, not for delight, to give later generations a true account of her lineage and life. She noted that others, such as Caesar and Ovid, had done the same.

Death
She died in London, and was buried in Westminster Abbey on 7 January 1674. Her husband arranged for a monument, by the sculptor Grinling Gibbons, to be erected in the north transept of the abbey. The epitaph reads: "Her name was Margaret Lucas youngest daughter of Lord Lucas, earl of Colchester, a noble family, for all the brothers were valiant, and all the sisters virtuous". All the Brothers Were Valiant became the title of a novel and number of film adaptations in the early 20th century.

Major works

Poems and Fancies (1653)
Poems and Fancies encompasses poems, epistles and some prose on topics that include natural philosophy, atoms, nature personified, macro/microcosms, other worlds, death, battle, hunting, love, honour and fame. Her poems at times take a dialogue form between such pairs as earth and darkness, an oak and a tree-cutter, melancholy and mirth, and peace and war. As noted by Mistress Toppe, formerly Elizabeth Chaplain and Cavendish's maid, Cavendish's writings took the form of poetical fiction, moral instruction, philosophical opinion, dialogue, discourses and poetical romances. Poems and Fancies included The Animal Parliament, a prose piece consisting largely of speeches and letters. The collection concludes with her thoughts on her writing and an advertisement for one of her future publications.

Authorial intent
Cavendish concluded the collection by stating she was aware that she did not write elegantly and that her phrasing and placement of words could be criticised. She said she had difficulty creating rhymes that could communicate her intended meaning. In short, Cavendish stated that she strove for meaning at the expense of elegance, her aim being to communicate ideas. She also noted that she expected her work to be criticised for not being useful, but she wrote not to instruct her readers in the arts, sciences or divinity, but to pass her time, asserting that she made better use of her time than many others. Cavendish returned to these points in her epistles and poems.

Epistle dedicatory
Cavendish, like authors such as Aphra Behn and William Wordsworth, stated her intended audience, writing purpose and philosophy in prefaces, prologues, epilogues and epistles. Her several epistle dedications for Poems and Fancies often sought to justify writing at a time when women writers were not encouraged and in terms of her subject choice. She instructed readers in how to read and respond to her poetry, most often by inviting praise from supporters and requesting silence from those unaffected by her work. Cavendish commonly used the epistles to admit and excuse potential weaknesses in her writing. They were directed at specific audiences and varied accordingly.

Mental spinning
Looking at several of the epistles in Poems and Fancies, her dedication to Sir Charles Cavendish, her brother in law, compares writing poetry to spinning and calls poetry mental spinning – it was commonly thought to be more appropriate for women to spin than to write, but she herself was better at writing. This is one of several occasions when Cavendish calls attention to stereotypical gender roles and expands on her reasons for not following them. As here, Cavendish often employed metaphors to describe her writing in terms of stereotypical feminine tasks or interests, such as spinning, fashion and motherhood. While criticising her own work, she said it would seem better if Sir Charles Cavendish looked favourably on it. Cavendish often appealed to readers for applause: if it were well received it would be somewhat improved. She ends by complimenting Charles's charity and generosity.

The pursuit of fame
In her epistle to noble and worthy ladies and in many others, Cavendish plainly expresses her desire for fame. She was not concerned that the best people should like her writing, as long as many people did. She justified this by linking fame to noise and noise to great numbers of people. Cavendish often assumed a defensive position, here justified by asserting that she expected critiques from males and females not only of her writing, but of her practice of writing itself. Cavendish argued that women who busy themselves writing will not act ineptly or gossip. Though she expected criticism from females, she calls for female support in gaining honour and reputation. She ends by stating that if she fails, she will see herself as martyred for the cause of women.

Defence of writing and fame
In her epistle to Mistress Toppe, Cavendish states a desire for fame as her main reason for writing. Again she asks for acceptance of her writing as a digression from accepted gender norms. While she often brings in metaphors of domestic or stereotypical feminine activities, here she tries to excuse her desire for fame by distancing her ambition from what is feminine: her ambition is a quest for glory, perfection and praise, which she states is not effeminate. Even while writing and pursuing fame she remained modest and honourable and does nothing to dishonour her family. Cavendish attributed her confidence, as a type of censor, to her belief that there is no evil, only innocence in her desire for fame. As to her writing without permission, Cavendish excuses herself by stating it is easier to get a pardon after the fact than to obtain leave beforehand. She places writing over gossip, as a common and negative female activity. She credits her books as tangible examples of her contemplation and contrasts her self-proclaimed harmless ideas with wild ideas that might lead to indiscreet actions.

Cavendish explored writing closet dramas in her exile. She became one of the best-known women playwrights through her interest in philosophical nature.
This epistle is followed by a response from Mistress Toppe, praising Cavendish and her skill in poetical fiction, moral instruction, philosophical opinion, dialogue, discourses and poetical romances.

Language, knowledge and error
Cavendish included a prefatory letter to natural philosophers. She knew no language but English, and even her English was somewhat limited, since she was familiar only with "that which is most usually spoke." In other words, she downplayed her knowledge of the technical vocabulary used by natural philosophers, and thereby her knowledge of opinions and discourses that preceded her own. She then dismissed errors she might make as trivial, asserting that she did not mean her text to be taken as truth. She wrote simply to pass time and expected her work to be read for the same end. This epistle also explained her writing in verse: poets were thought to write fiction and that fiction was aligned with pastime, not truth. So verse might be expected to contain errors. Cavendish lamented that her work was not more entertaining and advised readers to skip any part they did not like.

Writing to pass the time
Her epistle states that with no children and at that time no estate, she has a lot of spare time, which she fills by writing, not housekeeping. Food husbandry in poetry was well-ordered fancy composed of fine language, proper phrases and significant words. Cavendish excused errors that might be found in her work as due to youth and inexperience, for she wrote only to distract herself from hardships of her husband's and her own. Comparing her book to a child, she said that it was innocent, young, well-behaved, bashful and sensitive. Readers should blame her, not the book, if they did not like it. If, however, the book was well liked, she made it clear that she expected fame.

Instruction on comprehension and judgement
In her epistle to the poets, Cavendish notes that as women seldom wrote, her writing may be ridiculed, as the strange and unusual seem fantastical, the fantastical seems odd, and the odd seems ridiculous. She requests that her work be judged by reason, not prejudice. She then excuses weaknesses in her poetry by stating that she writes only to escape melancholy thoughts and fill idle time. She employs a food/feasting metaphor: her poems are not ripe, but applause and praise will make them pass as a "general feast" to those of vulgar taste who take quantity over quality. As was typical in her writing, applause is welcomed and criticism censored, as she advises those who dislike her poetry to keep silent. Hers are poems of fancy and so require study. She recommends that as one with a troubled conscience ought to look to a minister for guidance. Likewise a reader will ask a poet for help in understanding her poems. Attempting again to guide readers to a positive reception of her book, Cavendish distinguishes poets (able judges of poetry) from rhymers (faulty judges of poetry) and advises people not to call her book nonsense or poorly constructed out of their own ignorance and malice. Returning again to her desire for fame, Cavendish notes that if judged by an honest poet, who would not be envious, her work would receive applause.

Cavendish asks the reader to read her fancies (poems) slowly, paying heed to each word, for each is a fancy itself. She warns that if readers lose their place or skip lines, they will miss the meaning of the entire work.

Poems: excuses and instructions
Cavendish followed some epistles with poems on how they came to be published and how they should be received. The proximity of the poems to the epistles and their similarity in subject and tone, suggests that they may be interpreted as Cavendish's own point of view.

The poem The Poetresses sic hasty Resolution, like many of Cavendish's epistles, contains excuses for errors that may be found in the poet's work and begs for praise. The poet states that self-love influences her judgement of her own poetry, which she finds she likes so much that she is moved to continue writing in hope of fame. She claims to write without thought of how her work would be received by critics. She then recalls how she was visited by Reason, who advised her to stop writing. Reason said her writing was a waste of time, that her work would not be well received and she should not have her work printed, so that the printer would not lose money. Reason also stated that there were already too many books and she should burn what she had written to spare the world from more. The poet noted her own angry response: she sent her book to press before she could be persuaded otherwise. In hindsight, however, she regretted doing so: she felt ashamed by her writing and told the reader to pity her and wipe away her tears with praise.

In The Poetresses Petition, she compares a negative reception to her books with their death. If the books suffer such a death (i. e. criticism), she requests silence and that they be forgotten, without alteration or inscriptions, and left undisturbed unless new merit is found. Again Cavendish sought to censor criticism and promote fame by instructing that only positive criticism should be voiced.

In An Apology for Writing So Much upon This Book, she compares it to a child and the book/child and author/parent to birds. The book is like a baby bird just going out on its own. The author, like a parent bird, is unsure whether the book/baby bird will be safe and chirrups an attempt to protect it.

Nature's Pictures drawn by Fancy's Pencil to the Life (1656)
This is viewed as "Cavendish's most ambitious attempt to combine modes and genres." It includes short prose romances – "The Contract" and "Assaulted and Pursued Chastity" – and several prefatory addresses to the reader. The stories concern "the advantageous production of woman as spectacle" and "repeatedly [feminise] the aristocratic and chivalric trope (or figure) of the fair unknown."

A True Relation of my Birth, Breeding, and Life (1656)
Cavendish published this autobiographical memoir as an addendum to Natures Pictures Drawn by Fancies Pencil to the Life, in 1656. She wrote it at the age of 33, which has been discussed by literary critics. One critic sees Cavendish's autobiography as a way to gain credibility and a marketable image that would undercut a socially improper public image. Cavendish wrote her autobiography in response to what people were saying of her in her lifetime. It relates Cavendish's lineage, social status, fortune, upbringing, education and marriage, describes her pastimes and manners, and offers an account of her personality and ambition, including thoughts on her bashfulness, contemplative nature and writing. She also shares her views on gender (appropriate behaviour and activity), politics (Parliamentarians v. Royalists) and class (proper behaviour of servants).

The memoir details the lives of her family, including a short account of her brother Charles Lucas, one of the best Civil War Cavalier cavalry commanders, executed by the Parliamentarians for treason in the Second English Civil War. She goes on to address the economic and personal hardships that she and her family faced from the war and their political allegiance, such as loss of estates and bereavements.

CCXI Sociable Letters (1664)
Published in 1664 by William Wilson, CCXI Sociable Letters (1664) is a collection of letters, written as if composed by real women. The organisation is similar to that of The World's Olio (1655). The topics are as varied as the forms and length of the letters. They cover marriage, war, politics, medicine, science, English and classical literature, and miscellaneous matters like gambling and religious extremism. Some letters seem to point to characters as actual people – Thomas Hobbes may appear in letter 173 and C. R. stand for King Charles II, – and some are addressed to real people with whom Cavendish often communicated, but most are fictional, leading to a surprisingly vibrant, ongoing conversation and observation of contemporary life.

Observations upon Experimental Philosophy (1666)

Cavendish's natural philosophy
Eileen O'Neill provides an overview of Cavendish's natural philosophy and its critical reception in her introduction to Observations upon Experimental Philosophy. She describes Cavendish's natural philosophy as rejecting Aristotelianism and mechanical philosophy and favouring Stoic doctrines: while women rarely wrote about natural philosophy in the 17th century, Cavendish published six books on the subject. O'Neill points out that Cavendish herself was not formally educated in natural philosophy, though William Cavendish and his brother Charles shared an interest in the subject and supported her interest and study in the area. She may also have been influenced by social encounters with philosophers such as Thomas Hobbes. O'Neill believes Hobbes (who had instructed Charles in philosophy) had marked influence on Cavendish's natural philosophy, making her one of the few 17th-century supporters of Hobbes' materialist philosophy, which argued that incorporeal souls did not exist in nature. Beginning in the 1660s, Cavendish began to study the work of her contemporaries more seriously. O'Neill suggests that such study was meant to enable Cavendish to argue her own points better by contrast with those of other natural philosophers.

O'Neill notes that Cavendish's natural philosophy and her writing in general were criticised by many contemporaries and by more recent readers, such as Pepys, Henry More and Virginia Woolf. Cavendish's work has also received positive criticism and been lauded by many for tackling typically male-dominated subjects such as natural philosophy. Letters and poems of praise by her husband were included in several of her published works.

Writing as an honourable disease
Cavendish in her preface to Observations upon Experimental Philosophy states that she expects readers to say that her practice of writing prolifically is a disease. If so, Cavendish stated, many others, including Aristotle, Cicero, Homer and St Augustine, have suffered the same disease. It was an honour for someone of great ambition (as she often identified herself) to share the disease of such wise and eloquent men. In these, as in her other writings, she asserts that she writes for herself and that her writing is a harmless pastime when compared with those of many other women. She contradicts herself, however, by adding that she writes for delight, which she had denied in her previous work. Also somewhat contradictory is her intention of continuing to write even if she has no readers, which belies her desire for fame. Ultimately, Cavendish excuses her criticism of and engagement with the theories of other natural philosophers as a necessary step in the search for truth.

Learning versus wit
In her epistle to the reader, Cavendish writes that woman's wit may equal that of man, and women may be able to learn as easily as men. She argues that wit is natural, whereas learning is artificial, and in her time, men have more chance of educating themselves than women.

Cavendish remarks on her own experience reading philosophical works: many such works have challenged her understanding with their frequently difficult words and expressions. Thus Cavendish advises writers of philosophy to use language appropriate to less expert readers. She defends this by stating that philosophical terms should ease communication of thoughts. She believes that successful communication is possible in all languages and accuses those who complicate communication (particularly English writers) of aiming for esteem from those who admire writing simply because they do not understand it, without considering that it may be nonsense. In her own work, Cavendish states, she chooses not to use difficult terms, although she adds that she understands such terms. Her stated reason is that she desires her work to be accessible to people regardless of their education. Her aim is to communicate her ideas clearly. She requests that any errors that may be found in her work be overlooked and readers remain focused on her main ideas. Here, as in many epistles, she instructs readers on how to approach her work and requests them to read it fully and withhold criticism until they have done so.

The Description of a New World, Called the Blazing World (1666)

Cavendish's prose tale was published in 1666 and again in 1668, each time with Observations upon Experimental Philosophy.

As many such as Silvia Bowerbank and Sara Mendelson have noted, this early version of science fiction critiques and explores such issues as science, gender and power. It also views relations between imagination and reason and philosophy and fiction. Cavendish writes herself into the book, which details a fictional, quite separate new world and its empress. She remarks in her epilogue that she is the empress, adding that in much the same way as there was a Charles the First, she would be seen as Margaret the First.

Plays in 1662 and 1668
Two volumes of Cavendish's dramatic works were printed. Plays (1662), printed by A. Warren (London) includes:
Loves Adventures 
The Several Wits
Youths Glory, and Deaths Banquet
The Lady Contemplation
Wits Cabal
The Unnatural Tragedy
The Public Wooing
The Matrimonial Trouble
Nature's Three Daughters, Beauty, Love and Wit
The Religious
The Comical Hash
Bell in Campo 
A Comedy of the Apocryphal Ladies
The Female Academy

Plays, Never Before Printed (1668) was published by Anne Maxwell (London):
The Sociable Companions, or the Female Wits
The Presence 
Scenes (edited from The Presence)
The Bridals
The Convent of Pleasure
A Piece of a Play

Other works
Cavendish also published collections of Philosophical Letters (1664), orations, as in her collection entitled Orations (1662). Many of her works address such issues as natural philosophy, gender, power and manners. Cavendish's plays were never acted in her lifetime, but a number, including The Convent of Pleasure (1668) have been staged since. Several of Cavendish's works have epistles, prefaces, prologues and epilogues in which she discusses her work, philosophy and ambition, while instructing the reader on how to read and respond to her writing. Her work has been alternately criticised and championed from its original publication to the present day.

Critical reception
Cavendish as a woman author who was willing to converse with men on natural philosophy and prone to a theatrical sense of dress, gained the nickname "Mad Madge", while many contemporaries lambasted her works for perceived eccentricity. Fellow scholar and Royal Society member Samuel Pepys once wrote of her as "a mad, conceited, ridiculous woman" after reading one of her biographies. Dorothy Osborne reflected in one published letter, after reading a book by the Duchess, that she was "sure there are soberer people in Bedlam." This seems to typify the impression the public seems to have had of her, though she had her admirers, Mildmay Fane, Earl of Westmorland, John Dryden, Kenelm Digby, Henry More were among them. Joseph Glanvill and Walter Charleton took her opinions seriously and offered her advice. Charles Lamb enjoyed her Sociable Letters and so much admired her biography of her husband that he called it a jewel "for which no casket is rich enough."

On her scientific pursuits, she was belittled by the Royal Society, which excluded women from its ranks; Margaret Cavendish was the first female to be invited, and not until 1667 was she inducted as its first female member. One member, John Evelyn, saw in Cavendish "a mighty pretender to learning, poetry, and philosophy". Another, Robert Boyle, took many of the experiments shown by Cavendish to be trifles, disparaging her tendency to measure things by "strangeness" and "prettiness", as opposed to "use". Yet her knowledge was recognised by some, such as the protofeminist Bathsua Makin: "The present Dutchess of New-Castle, by her own Genius, rather than any timely Instruction, over-tops many grave Gown-Men." She saw her exemplifying what women could become through education. New manuscript evidence also suggests she was read and taken seriously by at least some early Royal Society members, such as its secretary, Nehemiah Grew.

Her eccentricity prevented her being taken seriously by literary historians for long after her death. Not until Virginia Woolf's The Common Reader (1925) did discourse rediscover the Duchess. Woolf remarked that:    Though her philosophies are futile, and her plays intolerable, and her verses mainly dull, the vast bulk of the Duchess is leavened by a vein of authentic fire. One cannot help following the lure of her erratic and lovable personality as it meanders and twinkles through page after page. There is something noble and Quixotic and high-spirited, as well as crack-brained and bird-witted, about her. Her simplicity is so open; her intelligence so active; her sympathy with fairies and animals so true and tender. She has the freakishness of an elf, the irresponsibility of some non-human creature, its heartlessness, and its charm.       After centuries of lost interest, Margaret Cavendish became popular in the 1980s, when rediscovered and analysed from a modern feminist perspective. Since then there have been nine book-length critical studies of her and a biography written in 1957, which can be found here. There have been many attempts to justify her eccentricity with a historical lens. She has also gained fame as one of the first female science-fiction writers, with her utopian novel The Blazing World. Her self inserted as a character named Margaret Cavendish in The Blazing World is said to be among the earliest examples of the modern Mary Sue trope. More recently, her plays have been examined in performance studies, for blurring the lines between performance and literature, challenging gender identities and upsetting gender norms. Further analysis on Cavendish appears here.

This new interest has engendered media projects. Margaret the First by Danielle Dutton dramatises her "with lucid precision and sharp cuts through narrative time", as a new approach to "imagining the life of a historical woman".] As the digital humanities grow, several projects have begun archiving Cavendish. The International Margaret Cavendish Society was set up as "a means of communication between scholars worldwide", to increase awareness of Cavendish's scholarly presence as a hub for newsletters, contacts and links to Cavendish's works. Likewise the Digital Cavendish Project works to make Cavendish's writing accessible and readable for people across the web and "highlight digital research, image archives, scholarly projects, and teaching materials". On 26 January 2018, the Digital Cavendish Twitter account announced that its next goal was to compile the Complete Works of Margaret Cavendish.

See also
List of animal rights advocates

References

Sources

Modern Editions of Works by Margaret Cavendish
Bell in Campo and The Sociable Companions. Ed. Alexandra G. Bennett. Peterborough, ON: Broadview Press, 2002.
Grounds of Natural Philosophy. Ed. Anne Thell. Peterborough, ON: Broadview Press, 2020.
Margaret Cavendish: Essential Writings. Ed. David Cunning. Oxford: Oxford University Press, 2019.
Margaret Cavendish: Political Writings. Ed. Susan James. Cambridge: Cambridge University Press, 2003.
Observations upon Experimental Philosophy. Ed. Eileen O'Neill. New York: Cambridge UP, 2001.
Observations upon Experimental Philosophy, abridged. Ed. Gwendolyn Marshall. Indianapolis: Hackett Publishing, 2016.
Paper Bodies: A Margaret Cavendish Reader. Eds. Sylvia Bowerbank and Sara Mendelson. Peterborough, ON: Broadview Press, 2000. 
Philosophical Letters, abridged. Ed. Deborah Boyle. Indianapolis: Hackett Publishing, 2021.
Poems and Fancies, with the Animal Parliament. Ed. Brandie Siegfried. Iter Press, 2018.
 Sociable Letters. Ed. James Fitzmaurice. Peterborough, ON: Broadview Press, 2004.
The Description of a New World Called The Blazing World And Other Writings. Ed. Kate Lilley. London: William Pickering, 1992.
The Convent of Pleasure and Other Plays. Ed. Anne Shaver. Baltimore: The Johns Hopkins Press, 1999.

Books
Anna Battigelli, Margaret Cavendish and the Exiles of the Mind.  Lexington: University Press of Kentucky, 1998
Deborah Boyle, The Well-Ordered Universe: The Philosophy of Margaret Cavendish. New York: Oxford University Press, 2018
Stephen Clucas, ed., A Princely Brave Woman: Essays on Margaret Cavendish, Duchess of Newcastle. Aldershot: Ashgate, 2003
Line Cottegnies and Nancy Weitz, eds., Authorial Conquests: Essays on Genre in the Writings of Margaret Cavendish. Cranbury, NJ: Fairleigh Dickinson University Press, 2003
David Cunning, Cavendish. Routledge, 2015
Douglas Grant, Margaret the First: A Biography of Margaret Cavendish Duchess of Newcastle 1623–1673. London: Rupert Hart-Davis, 1957
Kathleen Jones, Margaret Cavendish: A Glorious Fame. The life of the Duchess of Newcastle. London: Bloomsbury: , 1988
Emma L. E. Rees, Margaret Cavendish: Gender, Genre, Exile. Manchester: Manchester UP, 2004
Lisa Sarasohn, The Natural Philosophy of Margaret Cavendish: Reason and Fancy during the Scientific Revolution. Baltimore, MD: The Johns Hopkins University Press, 2010
Lisa Walters, Margaret Cavendish: Gender, Science and Politics. TOC Cambridge: Cambridge University Press, 2014
Kate Whitaker, Mad Madge: Margaret Cavendish, Duchess of Newcastle, Royalist, Writer and Romantic. London: Chatto and Windus, 2003 Mad Madge : the extraordinary life of Margaret Cavendish, Duchess of Newcastle, the first woman to live by her pen

Articles
N. N. W. Akkerman and M. Corporaal (2004), "Mad Science Beyond Flattery: The Correspondence of Margaret Cavendish and Constantijn Huygens", Early Modern Literary Studies
Justin Begley, "'The Minde is Matter Moved': Nehemiah Grew on Margaret Cavendish." Intellectual History Review 27, No. 4 (May 2017): 493–514
Deborah Boyle, "Fame, Virtue, and Government: Margaret Cavendish on Ethics and Politics." Journal of the History of Ideas 67, no. 2 (April 2006): 251–289.
Deborah Boyle, "Margaret Cavendish on Gender, Nature, and Freedom".  Hypatia 28, No. 3 (Summer 2013): 516–32.
Deborah Boyle, "Margaret Cavendish on Perception, Self-Knowledge, and Probable Opinion". Philosophy Compass 10, No. 7 (July 2015): 438–450
Deborah Boyle, "Margaret Cavendish's Nonfeminist Natural Philosophy". Configurations 12 (2004): 195–227
Karen Detlefsen, "Atomism, Monism, and Causation in the Natural Philosophy of Margaret Cavendish". Oxford Studies in Early Modern Philosophy, Vol. III, 199–240. Ed. Daniel Garber and Steven Nadler. Oxford: Clarendon Press, 2006
Karen Detlefsen, "Margaret Cavendish and Thomas Hobbes on Reason, Freedom, and Women".  In Feminist Interpretations of Thomas Hobbes, 149–168. Ed. Nancy J. Hirschmann and Joanne H. Wright. University Park: Pennsylvania State University Press, 2012
Karen Detlefsen, "Margaret Cavendish on the Relation between God and World".  Philosophy Compass 4, no. 3 (2009): 421–438
Karen Detlefsen, "Reason and Freedom: Margaret Cavendish on the Order and Disorder of Nature". Archiv für Geschichte der Philosophie 89, No. 2 (2007): 157–191
Lara Dodds, "Margaret Cavendish's Domestic Experiment". Genre and Women's Life Writing in Early Modern England. Ed. Michelle M. Dowd and Julie A. Eckerele. Hampshire: Ashgate, 2007. 151–168.
Elspeth Graham, "Intersubjectivity, Intertextuality, and Form in the Self-Writings of Margaret Cavendish". Genre and Women's Life Writing in Early Modern England. Ed. Michelle M. Dowd and Julie A. Eckerele. Hampshire: Ashgate, 2007. 131–150
Susan James, "The Philosophical Innovations of Margaret Cavendish". British Journal for the History of Philosophy 7, no. 2 (1999): 219–244
Kegl, Rosemary. ‘"The World I Have Made": Margaret Cavendish, feminism and the Blazing World'’, Feminist Readings of Early Modern Culture: Emerging Subjects. Edited by Valerie Traub, M. Lindsay Kaplan, and Dympna Callaghan. Cambridge: Cambridge University Press, 1996, pp.119–141
James Fitzmaurice, "Fancy and the Family: Self-characterizations of Margaret Cavendish". Huntington Library Quarterly 53.3 (1990): 198–209
James Fitzmaurice, "Margaret Cavendish on Her Own Writing: Evidence from Revision and Handmade Correction." PBSA 85.3 (1991): 297–308
Sara Heller Mendelson, "Margaret Cavendish, Duchess of Newcastle". The Mental World of Three Stuart Women. Brighton: Harvester, 1987, 12–61
Jeffrey Masten, "Material Cavendish: Paper, Performance, 'Sociable Virginity'". Modern Language Quarterly 65.1 (2004): 49–68
Gertrude Townshend Mayer, "Margaret Cavendish Duchess of Newcastle". Women of Letters Vol. 1. London: Richard Bentley & Son, 1894
Dolores Paloma, "Margaret Cavendish: Defining the female self". Women's Studies 1980, 7
Bronwen Price, "Feminine Modes of Knowing and Scientific Inquiry: Margaret Cavendish's Poetry as Case Study". Women and Literature in Britain, 1500–1700. Ed. Helen Wilcox. Cambridge: Cambridge University Press, 1996. 117–142
Diana Solomon, "Laugh, or Forever Hold Your Peace: Comic Crowd Control in Margaret Cavendish's Dramatic Prologues and Epilogues". Women and Comedy: History, Theory, Practice. Ed. Peter Dickinson, Anne Higgins, Paul Matthew St. Pierre, Diana Solomon and Sean Zwagerman. Lanham, MD: Fairleigh Dickinson UP, 2014. 55–64
Special issue on Margaret Cavendish, In-between: Essays & Studies in Literary Criticism, Vol. 9, 2000
Special Issue on Margaret Cavendish, Women's Writing, Vol. 4, No.3, 1997
Jo Wallwork, "Disruptive Behaviour in the Making of Science: Cavendish and the Community of Seventeenth-Century Science". Early Modern Englishwomen Testing Ideas. Ed. Jo Wallwork and Paul Salzman. Surrey: Ashgate, 2011. 41–54
Clara H. Whitemore, "Margaret Cavendish". Woman's Word in English Fiction: From the Restoration to the Mid-Victorian Period. New York and London: G. P. Putnam's Sons, 1910
Virginia Woolf, "The Duchess of Newcastle, The Common Reader". The Essays of Virginia Woolf, Volume IV, 1925–1928. Ed by Andrew McNeillie. London: Hogarth Press, 1994. 81–90

Further reading
Diana G. Barnes, "Epistolary Restoration: Margaret Cavendish's Letters". Epistolary Community in Print, 1580–1664. Surrey: Ashgate, 2013. 137–196
Anna Battigelli, Margaret Cavendish and the Exiles of the Mind. Lexington: University Press of Kentucky, 1998. 
Alexandra G. Bennett, "'Yes, and': Margaret Cavendish, the Passions and hermaphrodite Agency." Early Modern Englishwomen Testing Ideas. Ed. Jo Wallwork and Paul Salzman. Surrey: Ashgate, 2011. 75–88
Rebecca D'Monte, "Mirroring Female Power: Separatist Spaces in the Plays of Margaret Cavendish, Duchess of Newcastle". Female Communities 1600–1800: Literary Visions and Cultural Realities. Ed. Rebecca D'Monte and Nicole Pohl. New York: MacMillan, 2000. 93–110
Jane Donawerth, "The Politics of Renaissance Rhetorical Theory by Women". Political Rhetoric, Power, and Renaissance Women. Ed. C. Levin and P. A. Sullivan. Albany: SUNY Press, 1995. 257–272
Margaret J. M. Ezell Writing Women's Literary History. Baltimore: The Johns Hopkins University Press, 1996
Alison Findlay, Gweno Williams and Stephanie J. Hodgson-Wright, "'The Play is ready to be Acted': Women and dramatic production, 1570–1670". Women's Writing 6.1 (1999): 129–148
Amy Greenstadt, "Margaret's Beard". Early Modern Women: An Interdisciplinary Journal 5 (2010): 171–182
Theodora A. Jankowski, "Pure Resistance: Queer(y)ing Virginity in William Shakespeare's Measure for Measure and Margaret Cavendish's The Convent of Pleasure." Shakespeare Studies 26 (1998): 1–30
Katherine R. Kellett, "Performance, Performativity, and Identity in Margaret Cavendish's The Convent of Pleasure". SEL 48.2 (2008): 419–442
Kate Lilley, "Blazing Worlds: Seventeenth-Century Women's Utopian Writing". Women's Texts and Histories 1575–1760. Eds. Clare Brant and Diane Purkiss. London: Routledge, 1992. 102–133
Jeffrey Masten, Textual Intercourse: Collaboration, Authorship and Sexualities in Renaissance Drama. Cambridge: Cambridge University Press, 1997
Vimala Pasupathi, "New Model Armies: Re-contextualizing The Camp in Margaret Cavendish's Bell in Campo". ELH 78 (2011): 657–685
Kamille Stone Stanton, An Amazonian Heroickess': The Military Leadership of Queen Henrietta Maria in Margaret Cavendish's Bell in Campo (1662).' Early Theatre 10.2 (2007): 71–86
Ryan Stark, "Margaret Cavendish and Composition Style." Rhetoric Review 17 (1999): 264–81
Christine Mason Sutherland, "Aspiring to the Rhetorical Tradition: A Study of Margaret Cavendish,"in Listening to Their Voices, ed. M. Wertheimer, 255–71. Columbia, SC: University of South Carolina Press, 1997
Christine Mason Sutherland, "Margaret Cavendish, Duchess of Newcastle". The Dictionary of Literary Biography, Volume 281: British Rhetoricians and Logicians, 1500–1660, Second Series, 36–47. Detroit: Gale, 2003
Sophie Tomlinson, "'My Brain the Stage': Margaret Cavendish and the Fantasy of Female Performance". Women's Texts and Histories 1575–1760. Ed. Clare Brant and Diane Purkiss. London: Routledge, 1992. 134–163
Valerie Traub, The Renaissance of Lesbianism in Early Modern England. Cambridge: Cambridge University Press, 2002
Marion Wynne-Davies, '"Fornication in My Owne Defence': Rape, Theft and Assault Discourses in Margaret Cavendish's The Sociable Companion". Expanding the Canon of Early Modern Women's Writing. Ed. Paul Salzman. Cambridge: Cambridge Scholars Publishing, 2010. 14–48

External links

Digital Cavendish: A Scholarly Collaboration
Margaret Cavendish (1623-1673), Project Vox''
Cunning, David, "Margaret Lucas Cavendish", The Stanford Encyclopedia of Philosophy
The International Margaret Cavendish Society

Essays by Margaret Cavendish at Quotidiana.org
Biography of Margaret Cavendish, Duchess of Newcastle, with links to online catalogues, on the website of Manuscripts and Special Collections, The University of Nottingham
Cavendish plays online
Margaret Cavendish: bibliographical and biographical references. - Center for the History of Women Philosophers and Scientists

1623 births
1673 deaths
17th-century English women writers
17th-century English writers
17th-century English novelists
17th-century philosophers
17th-century English scientists
17th-century women scientists
People associated with animal welfare and rights
Margaret Cavendish
Margaret
Newcastle
English women philosophers
English essayists
English philosophers
English dramatists and playwrights
English science fiction writers
English women poets
English women dramatists and playwrights
Rhetoricians
Women science fiction and fantasy writers
British women essayists
Household of Henrietta Maria
People from Colchester
People from Essex
Burials at Westminster Abbey
Wives of knights